Dress Me Slowly is the fifth studio album by the Australian rock band, You Am I. It was released in April, 2001, by BMG Australia. The album was produced, recorded and mixed by Clif Norrell at Q Studios in Sydney, except for "Beautiful Girl", "Watcha Doin' To Me" and "Kick a Hole in the Sky" which were recorded by Paul McKercher at Sing Sing Studios in Melbourne and mixed by Skip Saylor Studios in Los Angeles. It was the first studio album to feature lead guitarist Davey Lane. "Beautiful Girl", "Watcha Doin' To Me" and "Kick a Hole in the Sky" were all recorded around 6 months after the album was nominally finished, because the band had written them in the interim and simply wanted to include them in the final package.

Having signed with an American label, the band was asked to record demos for the first time, and linked with new producers. Tim Rogers said, "I hated the American guys and the English guys who were asking us to modernise our sound. We're just so unsuited to that. I've got the voice of a 12-year-old girl and the mind of a 70-year-old dero. But I love that record. The actual recording of it with Clif was an absolute joy."

The album debuted at #3 on the ARIA charts, breaking their run of #1 debuts since Hi Fi Way. A small vintage clothes store in Fitzroy, Melbourne, has paid tribute to the album by naming the store "Dress Me Slowly".

Track listing 
All songs written by Tim Rogers.
"Judge Roy"
"Get Up"
"Beautiful Girl"
"Damage"
"Doug Sahm"
"Watcha Doin' To Me"
"Satisfied Mind"
"Bring Some Sun Back"
"Weeds"
"Gone, Gone, Gone"
"Sugar"
"Kick a Hole in the Sky"
"End O' The Line"

The Temperance Union EP
Limited copies of the album in digipack packaging included a bonus CD of eight songs called The Temperance Union EP, consisting of solo songs written and performed by Tim Rogers. He later formed a backing band for his solo albums named The Temperance Union.
"Makin' Toast"
"The Smokin' Popes"
"Faith"
"Paragon Cafe"
"The Loneliest Folk in the World"
"Dreamin'"
"The Man You Want Me To Be"
"Get Drunk, Ring Yer Friends"

The words for "Dreamin'" were put to new music and reappeared as "I Only Understand Her in the Rain" on Spit Polish.

Personnel

You Am I 
 Tim Rogers - vocals, guitar
 Andy Kent - bass guitar
 Russell Hopkins - drums, percussion
 Davey Lane - guitar

Additional musicians 
 Adrian Keating - Violin 1
 Michelle Kelly - Violin 2
 Deborah Lander - Viola
 Kate Morgan - Cello
 James Greening - horns
 Carolyn Johns - horns
 Anthony Kable - horns
 Phil Slater - horns

Charts

References

2001 albums
You Am I albums